Hallo Robbie! is a German television series, which was broadcast on ZDF between 2001 and 2009. It is named after the character of Robbie, played by Gordy the seal. Gordy was found dead in Tetzitzer Lake in Rügen in May 2005.

See also
List of German television series

References

External links
 

2001 German television series debuts
2009 German television series endings
Television series about mammals
German-language television shows
ZDF original programming